Charles Lefrançois (born December 19, 1972) is a retired high jumper from Canada, who represented his native country at the 1996 Summer Olympics in Atlanta, United States. He won the silver medal at the 1997 Summer Universiade. He is a seven-time national champion (1993−1998) for Canada in the men's high jump event.

Competition record

References
 Canadian Olympic Committee

1972 births
Living people
Athletes (track and field) at the 1994 Commonwealth Games
Athletes (track and field) at the 1995 Pan American Games
Athletes (track and field) at the 1996 Summer Olympics
Canadian male high jumpers
French Quebecers
Olympic track and field athletes of Canada
Commonwealth Games competitors for Canada
Pan American Games track and field athletes for Canada
Universiade medalists in athletics (track and field)
Athletes from Montreal
Universiade silver medalists for Canada
Medalists at the 1997 Summer Universiade